Rędziny-Borek  is a village in the administrative district of Gmina Słaboszów, within Miechów County, Lesser Poland Voivodeship, in southern Poland.

The village has a population of 220.

References

Villages in Miechów County